= Piercer of microtubule wall 1 protein =

Protein found in humans

PIERCE1

Identifiers
- Aliases: PIERCE1, piercer of microtubule wall 1, RbEST47, chromosome 9 open reading frame 116, C9orf116
- External IDs: OMIM: 614502; MGI: 1916577; HomoloGene: 35416; GeneCards: PIERCE1; OMA:PIERCE1 - orthologs

Gene location (Human)
Chr.	Chromosome 9 (human)
Band	9q34.3	Start	135,495,181 bp
Band	9q34.3	End	135,501,734 bp

Gene location (Mouse)
Chr.	Chromosome 2 (mouse)
Band	2|2 A3	Start	28,352,013 bp
Band	2|2 A3	End	28,356,344 bp
RNA expression pattern
Bgee	Human / Mouse (ortholog); Top expressed in: bronchial epithelial cell; right uterine tube; olfactory zone of nasal mucosa; left testis; right testis; mucosa of paranasal sinus; nasal epithelium; caput epididymis; testicle; gonad / Top expressed in: seminiferous tubule; right lung lobe; olfactory epithelium; lumbar subsegment of spinal cord; otolith organ; utricle; spermatid; Epithelium of choroid plexus; embryo; embryo; More reference expression data
BioGPS	n/a
Gene ontology
Molecular function	protein binding
Cellular component	nucleus
Biological process	cellular response to DNA damage stimulus; determination of left/right symmetry; regulation of gene expression; cellular response to UV-C
Sources:Amigo / QuickGO
Orthologs
Species	Human	Mouse
Entrez	138162	69327
Ensembl	ENSG00000160345	ENSMUSG00000026831
UniProt	Q5BN46	Q5BN45
RefSeq (mRNA)	NM_001048265; NM_144654	NM_027040
RefSeq (protein)	NP_001041730; NP_653255	NP_081316
Location (UCSC)	Chr 9: 135.5 – 135.5 Mb	Chr 2: 28.35 – 28.36 Mb
PubMed search
- Wikidata
View/Edit Human	View/Edit Mouse

Piercer of microtubule wall 1 protein is a protein that in humans is encoded by the PIERCE1 gene.
